Fatoumata is a West African women's given name. Notable people include:

 Fatoumata Bagayoko (born 1988), Malian basketball player
 Fatoumata Coly (born 1984), Senegalese sprinter
 Fatoumata Coulibaly, Malian actress and women's rights activist
 Fatoumata Dembélé Diarra (born 1949), Malian lawyer and judge
 Fatoumata Diawara (born 1982), Malian musician
 Fatoumata Diop (born 1986), Senegalese sprinter
 Fatoumata Kaba (journalist) (born 1969), Guinean journalist
 Fatoumata Koné (born 1988), Ivorian basketball player
 Fatoumata Nafo-Traoré, Malian public health official
 Fatoumata Ndiaye (born 1989), Malian Equatoguinean-born footballer
 Fatoumata Samassékou (born 1987), Malian swimmer
 Fatoumata Tambajang (born 1949), Gambian politician

See also 
 Fatou (disambiguation)
 Fatu (disambiguation)